Gempol–Pandaan Toll Road is a toll road in East Java, Indonesia. The toll road was opened in May 2015. This toll road is a continuation of the Surabaya–Porong Toll Road that will be connected to Pandaan-Malang Toll Road. This toll was built to help lessen the traffic congestion on the existing inter-city roads connecting Surabaya and Malang.

Toll gate

References

Toll roads in Indonesia
Transport in East Java